The Queen Elizabeth Oak  is a large sessile oak tree in Cowdray Park near the village of Lodsworth in the Western Weald, West Sussex, England. It lies within the South Downs National Park. According to this estimate it began to grow in the 11th or 12th century AD. In June 2002, The Tree Council designated the Queen Elizabeth Oak, one of fifty Great British Trees, in recognition of its place in the national heritage. According to the Woodland Trust, the tree is the third largest sessile oak tree to be recorded in the United Kingdom after the Pontfadog Oak in Wales and the Marton Oak in Cheshire, although this tree is now fragmented.

According to legend, Queen Elizabeth I stood with an arrow ready in her bow waiting for a stag to be driven within range for her to shoot it, although she was unsuccessful.

See also
 List of individual trees
 List of Great British Trees

References

External links
Monumental trees in Cowdray Park in Midhurst.
Recorded information about the Queen Elizabeth Oak on the Ancient Tree Hunt

Individual oak trees
Individual trees in England
West Sussex
Elizabeth I